Polish Christian Democratic Party (PSChD, commonly known as Chrześcijańska Demokracja or Chadecja),  was a political party of Polish right wing Christian democracy faction existing in the first year of the Second Polish Republic. Its leader and main activist was Wojciech Korfanty.

In 1922 Chadecja became part of the Chrześcijański Związek Jedności Narodowej (Chiena) coalition. Part of the Chjeno-Piast coalition after signing the Lanckorona Pact in 1923.

After the May Coup of 1926, split into three factions. Member of Centrolew coalition in 1929. Member of Front Morges coalition in 1937, and merged with National Workers' Party to form the Labor Party.

Election results

Sejm

Senate

Literature

Notes

Catholic political parties
Defunct political parties in Poland
Political parties established in 1919
Political parties disestablished in 1928
Conservative parties in Poland
Defunct Christian political parties
1919 establishments in Poland